The 2002 Mid-Continent Conference men's basketball tournament was held March 3–5, 2002, at Allen County War Memorial Coliseum in Fort Wayne, Indiana.

 defeated  in the title game, 88–55, to win their seventh AMCU/Mid-Con/Summit League championship. The Crusaders earned an automatic bid to the 2002 NCAA tournament as the #13 seed in the East region.

Format
All eight conference members qualified for the tournament. First round seedings were based on regular season record.

Bracket

References

2001–02 Mid-Continent Conference men's basketball season
Summit League men's basketball tournament